Kastellokampos is a neighbourhood of the city of Patras, Achaea, Greece. It has been part of the municipality of Patras since 1879. It is situated on the Gulf of Patras coast, 6 km north of the city centre of Patras and 1.5 km southwest of Rio. The population is between 2,000 and 3,000. The river Charadros flows into the sea in Kastellokampos. Motorway 5 passes east of the neighbourhood. Kastellokampos has a station on the Piraeus–Patras railway, served by Proastiakos suburban rail.

Population

References

External links
 Kastellokampos GTP Travel Pages

Neighborhoods in Patras